The C.D. and Eliza Heath Bevington Privy is a historic building located in Winterset, Iowa, United States.  Bevington was a pharmacist who passed through the area in 1849 on his way to the California Gold Rush.  He settled in Winterset in 1853 after he made his fortune, and worked as a real estate agent, farmer, livestock dealer, and banker. The  structure is composed of roughly squared quarry faced rubble that is laid in a two against one bond.  There is a stone vault with a depth of  beneath the entire structure. The privy served the C.D. Bevington House. It was listed on the National Register of Historic Places in 1987.  It is now part of a museum complex operated by the Madison County Historical Society.

References 

Buildings and structures completed in 1856
Vernacular architecture in Iowa
Winterset, Iowa
Buildings and structures in Madison County, Iowa
National Register of Historic Places in Madison County, Iowa